The South End Subdivision is a railroad line owned by CSX Transportation in the U.S. states of North Carolina and South Carolina. At its north end the line continues south from the North End Subdivision and at its south end the line continues south as the Charleston Subdivision. The South End Subdivision is a part of CSX's A Line, one of their mainline which ultimately extends from Richmond, Virginia to Tampa, Florida.

History
The South End Subdivision is made up of various historical railroads. From Wilson to Pee Dee, South Carolina, it was built as the Fayetteville Cutoff, which opened gradually from 1886 to 1892. From Pee Dee to Florence, it was part of the Wilmington and Manchester Railroad, which began operation in 1853.

These railroads all eventually became part of the Atlantic Coast Line Railroad.

See also
 List of CSX Transportation lines

References

CSX Transportation lines
Rail infrastructure in South Carolina
Rail infrastructure in North Carolina